Clube Atlético Metropolitano is a Brazilian football club based in the city of Blumenau, Santa Catarina state. Founded in January 22 of 2002. Its official colors are green and white.

Current squad

Honours

Campeonato Catarinense - Serie B
Winners (2018)

Centenary Tournament of FC Lustenau 07
Winners (2007)

Season records

 
Association football clubs established in 2002
Football clubs in Santa Catarina (state)
Blumenau
2002 establishments in Brazil